The Street is a novel published in 1946 by African-American writer Ann Petry. Set in World War II era Harlem, it centers on the life of Lutie Johnson. Petry's novel is a commentary on the social injustices that confronted her character, Lutie Johnson, as a single black mother during this period. Lutie is confronted by racism, sexism, and classism on a daily basis in her pursuit of the American dream for herself and her son, Bub. Lutie fully subscribes to the belief that if she follows the adages of Benjamin Franklin by working hard and saving wisely, she will be able to achieve the  dream of being financially independent and move from the tenement in which she lives on 116th Street. It is Junto, through his manipulations to possess Lutie sexually, who ultimately leads Lutie to murder Junto's henchman, Boots.

The Street was an instant bestseller. It is the first novel by an African-American woman to sell more than a million copies.

Plot summary

Shifting between multiple perspectives, The Street uses extensive flashbacks to reveal its plot. Lutie Johnson has an eight-year-old son, Bub, to support. Separated but not legally divorced from Bub's father, Jim, Lutie feels that Jim's inability to find employment, her decision to work as a domestic for a wealthy white family in Connecticut, and Jim's subsequent infidelity ruined her marriage.

Lutie moves into a small apartment on 116th Street in Harlem. Taking an immediate dislike to the super, Jones, she decides to take the apartment, agreeing to pay about thirty dollars a month in rent.

Jones becomes sexually obsessed with Lutie; recalling his youth in the Navy, Jones remembers his feelings of loneliness and sexual frustration while aboard ship, a condition that worsened as he began working and living in basement apartments and boiler rooms. Jones resents his live-in girlfriend, Min, due to her lack of physical attractiveness, venting his aggressions on her. Jones befriends Bub in hopes of getting Lutie to pay attention to him. Sensing Jones' intentions, Mrs. Hedges, the madame of a brothel, tells Jones not to bother as a wealthy white man has already taken an interest in her.

Mrs. Hedges, a heavy-set woman who is bald and badly disfigured from a fire, is referring to Junto, the proprietor of a local bar as well as the owner of several pieces of real estate. Junto has been friends with Mrs. Hedges for many years, striking up her acquaintance as she rummaged through the trash for food. Junto, who, at that time collected cans and scraps for a living, employs her then makes her a partner of sorts, putting her in charge of maintenance and rent collection once he buys his first building. After surviving the fire, Mrs. Hedges starts running a brothel out of  her apartment. Acutely sensing the desperation and boredom of the young people who live in the neighborhood, Mrs. Hedges suggests that Junto open up dance halls, bars, and brothels, which Junto does. Junto, who has developed feelings for Mrs. Hedges by this point, makes an overture to her but is rejected.

Min, meanwhile, increasingly fearful of Jones, seeks out a practitioner of hoodoo. After getting a referral from Mrs. Hedges, Min finds David The Prophet. Surprised and comforted by how closely David listens to her, Min pays for a cross, some powder, some drops for Jones' morning coffee, and some candles to burn at night. Feeling reassured, Min hangs the cross over the bed as David suggested. When Min defiantly refuses to tell Jones where she had been, he advances on her angrily until he sees the cross over the bed. Feeling a superstitious dread, Jones retreats.

One night, Lutie has drinks at Junto's. After entertaining the crowd with a song, Lutie makes the acquaintance of Boots Smith, a bandleader and an employee of Junto's. Insincerely promising to help her establish a singing career, Boots convinces Lutie to take a ride with him. Lutie, who has already decided not to sleep with Boots, agrees to sing with his band. After returning home, she discovers that Bub has let Jones into the apartment while she was out and that Jones had rifled through her things.

Sometime after Lutie begins singing, Jones attacks her in the hallway, attempting to drag her into the basement. Lutie screams for help and Mrs. Hedges comes to her rescue. After inviting her inside for tea, Mrs. Hedges tells her of Junto's interest in her. Junto also tells Boots the same thing, making him promise not to pursue a romance with Lutie. Boots, indebted to Junto for helping him evade the draft, reluctantly agrees. He also agrees not to pay Lutie for her singing and to arrange a meeting between Lutie and Junto.

After Mrs. Hedges tells him yet again that he can't have Lutie, Jones angrily decides to get even with her. He convinces Bub to steal mail, paying Bub a few dollars. Bub, who initially refused Jones' offer, is eager to work; after hearing Lutie (who has just realized that she won't be paid for her singing) loudly cursing their poverty, Bub decides to help out by getting a job. Jones also implicates Min in the scheme by tricking her into getting copies of the mailbox keys made for him.

Bub is caught stealing the mail and sent to the Children's Shelter until he can be seen in Children's Court. Desperate to get Bub out of custody, Lutie consults a lawyer. Not knowing that she doesn't need a lawyer for the upcoming hearing, she agrees to pay two hundred dollars for the man's services.

Despairing of coming up with the money on her own, Lutie decides to ask Boots for help. Boots promises to get the money for her the next night. The next day, Lutie visits Bub at the Children's Shelter but is unable to ask him about the letters. That night, Mrs. Hedges once again reminds her that Junto is interested in her. Feeling apprehensive, Lutie makes her appointment with Boots. Junto is there. Realizing Boots, Mrs. Hedges, and Junto have been working in concert, she yells at Boots to get Junto out of the apartment. After conferring with Boots, Junto leaves, warning Boots once again not to make any romantic overtures to Lutie. It is then that Boots decides to take Lutie for himself whether Junto approves or not.

After a half-hearted attempt to convince Lutie to become Junto's mistress, Boots makes a sexual advance on her, kissing her and grabbing her breast. He slaps her twice when she pulls away. Lutie grabs a heavy candlestick and beats Boots to death with it, funneling all of her rage at her powerlessness into a succession of violent blows. Lutie steals Boots' wallet, deciding to use the money inside to pay the lawyer's fees. Realizing that she would be caught, however, Lutie puts half the money back and flees the apartment. Knowing that she will never be able to rescue her son, Lutie buys a one-way ticket to Chicago and boards a train.

Characters
Lutie Johnson, the story's protagonist, is a single black mother who moves away from her family to live on her own in 1940s Harlem. She lives in a building with her son, Bub, and is constantly reading and thinking about Benjamin Franklin, who she considers a hero, and whose work-ethic she tries to emulate.
Mrs. Hedges is a madam who lives in Lutie's building. She pays off the police to make sure that she is not prosecuted for running a whorehouse. She spends her days gazing out of her window and at the people passing on 116th street.
Min lives with Jones, the abusive super. She has a cross above her bed, and sees Prophet David about ways she can make Jones a better man.
Jones is the super of Lutie's building, who lusts after Lutie, and is a very lonely man. He was previously in the Navy, and he also worked as a night watchman.
Junto owns Junto's Bar and Grill. Junto is a term originating in English politics of the 1640s and the early 1700s, that was made famous in America by Benjamin Franklin who founded a club in Philadelphia with the name Junto (c. 1730), and the Bar and Grill in the book serves as a meeting place for the poor people of Harlem.
Boots Smith is a band leader who offers Lutie a chance to sing in his band. Employed by Junto.
Bub is Lutie's son. He is young, and dislikes being left alone. He is scared of the dark.

Scholarly perspectives

See also

Their Eyes Were Watching God

References

1946 American novels
Novels by Ann Petry
African-American novels
Harlem in fiction
Novels set in Manhattan
Proletarian literature